Table Tennis Canada (French: Tennis de Table Canada), colloquially known as TTCAN, is the non-profit governing body for table tennis in Canada and is responsible for cataloging and sanctioning tournaments within Canada. It was founded in 1929 as the Canadian Table Tennis Association. In addition to processing tournaments, TTCAN maintains a national rating and ranking system. It also oversees the Canadian National Teams. In total, TTCAN has over 9,000 members. The headquarters of Canada Table Tennis is located in Ottawa, Ontario, Canada, which is also home to the Canadian Olympic Training Center.

History
The Canadian Table Tennis Association was formed in 1929, with Québec as the founding provincial member and Ontario joining 5 years later. A long association with the Canadian National Exhibition began in 1936, when the first Canadian Table Tennis Championships were staged there. The CTTA operates a computerized rating system that allows any competitive player to be ranked, both provincially and nationally
Canada's table-tennis stars of the 1930s were Paul Chapdelaine and J.J. Desjardins of Montréal.

In the 1970s, Violette Nesukaitis, of Toronto, emerged as a strong international player. Winner of 4 North American open championships, she travelled to China in 1971 on a Canadian team, the first table-tennis team to be invited to that country. In 1973 she was ranked 3rd among Commonwealth women players. She retired in 1976.

In the 1990s. 2 world class players, Geng Lijuan and Wenguan Johnny Huang, dominated Canadian table tennis. Both achieved top-10 world rankings and represented Canada at the Olympic Games in 1996 and 2000. Their best results were recorded in 1996 at Atlanta; Huang defeated the number one seed and defending Olympic champion to finish fifth overall in the men's singles; Lijuan attained a ninth-place finish. She also won 4 World Championships titles.

Members
 Alberta Table Tennis Association
 British Columbia Table Tennis Association
 Manitoba Table Tennis Association
 Newfoundland & Labrador Table Tennis Association
 Nova Scotia Table Tennis Association
 Nunavut Table Tennis Association
 Ontario Table Tennis Association
 Prince Edward Island Table Tennis Association
 Québec Table Tennis Association 
 Saskatchewan Table Tennis Association
 Yukon Table Tennis Association
 Table Tennis North

Canada Table Tennis National Teams 
The rosters for the Canada Table Tennis National Teams are as follows:

 Eugene Wang
 Pierre-Luc Thériault
 Marko Medjugorac
 Filip Ilijevski
 Jeremy Hazin
 Antoine Bernadet
 Pierre-Luc Hinse
 Zhang Mo
 Anqi Luo
 Alicia Coté
 Rachel Yi Lu
 Ioulia Degtia
 Amy J. Nichols
 Sara Yuen
 Justina Yeung

See also
 International Table Tennis Federation
 USA Table Tennis Champions
 North American Table Tennis Championships

References

External links
TTCAN.ca CAN Table Tennis Website
Canadian Chinese Table Tennis Association
Ontario Table Tennis

National members of the North American Table Tennis Union
Table Tennis
Canadian table tennis organizations